The Rostov constituency (No.149) is a Russian legislative constituency in Rostov Oblast. The constituency stretches from eastern Rostov-on-Don to southern Rostov Oblast. Until 2007 the constituency was more compact and was actually based in western Rostov-on-Don, however, after 2015 redistricting territory of the former Rostov constituency was placed into Nizhnedonskoy constituency, while new Rostov constituency was created from parts of Proletarsky and Belaya Kalitva constituencies.

Members elected

Election results

1993

|-
! colspan=2 style="background-color:#E9E9E9;text-align:left;vertical-align:top;" |Candidate
! style="background-color:#E9E9E9;text-align:left;vertical-align:top;" |Party
! style="background-color:#E9E9E9;text-align:right;" |Votes
! style="background-color:#E9E9E9;text-align:right;" |%
|-
|style="background-color:"|
|align=left|Igor Bratishchev
|align=left|Communist Party
|
|20.27%
|-
|style="background-color:#0085BE"|
|align=left|Mikhail Yemelyanov
|align=left|Choice of Russia
| -
|5.90%
|-
| colspan="5" style="background-color:#E9E9E9;"|
|- style="font-weight:bold"
| colspan="3" style="text-align:left;" | Total
| 
| 100%
|-
| colspan="5" style="background-color:#E9E9E9;"|
|- style="font-weight:bold"
| colspan="4" |Source:
|
|}

1995

|-
! colspan=2 style="background-color:#E9E9E9;text-align:left;vertical-align:top;" |Candidate
! style="background-color:#E9E9E9;text-align:left;vertical-align:top;" |Party
! style="background-color:#E9E9E9;text-align:right;" |Votes
! style="background-color:#E9E9E9;text-align:right;" |%
|-
|style="background-color:"|
|align=left|Mikhail Yemelyanov
|align=left|Yabloko
|
|35.20%
|-
|style="background-color:"|
|align=left|Gennady Serdyukov
|align=left|Communist Party
|
|18.23%
|-
|style="background-color:"|
|align=left|Nikolay Khachaturov
|align=left|Independent
|
|5.07%
|-
|style="background-color:"|
|align=left|Viktor Goncharov
|align=left|Independent
|
|3.53%
|-
|style="background-color:"|
|align=left|Vladimir Zubkov
|align=left|Independent
|
|3.50%
|-
|style="background-color:#2C299A"|
|align=left|Vladimir Kalinko
|align=left|Congress of Russian Communities
|
|3.36%
|-
|style="background-color:"|
|align=left|Aleksandr Kokorev
|align=left|Liberal Democratic Party
|
|3.27%
|-
|style="background-color:#DA2021"|
|align=left|Natalya Serdyukova
|align=left|Ivan Rybkin Bloc
|
|2.74%
|-
|style="background-color:#FF4400"|
|align=left|Aleksandr Rodin
|align=left|Party of Workers' Self-Government
|
|2.36%
|-
|style="background-color:"|
|align=left|Aleksandr Tolmachev
|align=left|Independent
|
|2.13%
|-
|style="background-color:#019CDC"|
|align=left|Yevgenia Vostrova
|align=left|Party of Russian Unity and Accord
|
|2.00%
|-
|style="background-color:#2998D5"|
|align=left|Yevgeny Nikitin
|align=left|Russian All-People's Movement
|
|1.70%
|-
|style="background-color:"|
|align=left|Grigory Abaziyev
|align=left|Independent
|
|1.44%
|-
|style="background-color:"|
|align=left|Simon Sekizyan
|align=left|Education — Future of Russia
|
|1.01%
|-
|style="background-color:"|
|align=left|Aleksandr Kabanov
|align=left|Independent
|
|0.99%
|-
|style="background-color:"|
|align=left|Pyotr Bystrov
|align=left|Independent
|
|0.92%
|-
|style="background-color:#A8A821"|
|align=left|Anzhela Khachaturyan
|align=left|Stable Russia
|
|0.89%
|-
|style="background-color:"|
|align=left|Aleksandr Zurnadzhiyev
|align=left|Party of Tax Cuts' Supporters
|
|0.63%
|-
|style="background-color:#000000"|
|colspan=2 |against all
|
|8.26%
|-
| colspan="5" style="background-color:#E9E9E9;"|
|- style="font-weight:bold"
| colspan="3" style="text-align:left;" | Total
| 
| 100%
|-
| colspan="5" style="background-color:#E9E9E9;"|
|- style="font-weight:bold"
| colspan="4" |Source:
|
|}

1999

|-
! colspan=2 style="background-color:#E9E9E9;text-align:left;vertical-align:top;" |Candidate
! style="background-color:#E9E9E9;text-align:left;vertical-align:top;" |Party
! style="background-color:#E9E9E9;text-align:right;" |Votes
! style="background-color:#E9E9E9;text-align:right;" |%
|-
|style="background-color:"|
|align=left|Mikhail Yemelyanov (incumbent)
|align=left|Yabloko
|
|45.65%
|-
|style="background-color:"|
|align=left|Vyacheslav Antokhin
|align=left|Communist Party
|
|27.14%
|-
|style="background-color:#7C273A"|
|align=left|Boris Sturov
|align=left|Movement in Support of the Army
|
|6.56%
|-
|style="background-color:#084284"|
|align=left|Vasily Gatashov
|align=left|Spiritual Heritage
|
|2.21%
|-
|style="background-color:"|
|align=left|Leonid Troyko
|align=left|Independent
|
|1.22%
|-
|style="background-color:#000000"|
|colspan=2 |against all
|
|15.14%
|-
| colspan="5" style="background-color:#E9E9E9;"|
|- style="font-weight:bold"
| colspan="3" style="text-align:left;" | Total
| 
| 100%
|-
| colspan="5" style="background-color:#E9E9E9;"|
|- style="font-weight:bold"
| colspan="4" |Source:
|
|}

2003

|-
! colspan=2 style="background-color:#E9E9E9;text-align:left;vertical-align:top;" |Candidate
! style="background-color:#E9E9E9;text-align:left;vertical-align:top;" |Party
! style="background-color:#E9E9E9;text-align:right;" |Votes
! style="background-color:#E9E9E9;text-align:right;" |%
|-
|style="background-color:"|
|align=left|Mikhail Yemelyanov (incumbent)
|align=left|Yabloko
|
|43.84%
|-
|style="background-color:"|
|align=left|Vladimir Bessonov
|align=left|Communist Party
|
|21.09%
|-
|style="background-color:#7C73CC"|
|align=left|Viktor Chernov
|align=left|Great Russia – Eurasian Union
|
|4.20%
|-
|style="background-color:"|
|align=left|Marat Zainalabidov
|align=left|Liberal Democratic Party
|
|3.89%
|-
|style="background-color:"|
|align=left|Boris Sturov
|align=left|Independent
|
|3.20%
|-
|style="background-color:"|
|align=left|Oleg Pobegaylov
|align=left|Russian Party of Labour
|
|1.43%
|-
|style="background-color:"|
|align=left|Albert Zaripov
|align=left|Independent
|
|1.13%
|-
|style="background-color:#164C8C"|
|align=left|Aleksandr Kryuchkov
|align=left|United Russian Party Rus'
|
|1.06%
|-
|style="background-color:"|
|align=left|Aleksey Pelipenko
|align=left|Independent
|
|0.61%
|-
|style="background-color:"|
|align=left|Yury Netrebov
|align=left|Independent
|
|0.57%
|-
|style="background-color:#000000"|
|colspan=2 |against all
|
|17.26%
|-
| colspan="5" style="background-color:#E9E9E9;"|
|- style="font-weight:bold"
| colspan="3" style="text-align:left;" | Total
| 
| 100%
|-
| colspan="5" style="background-color:#E9E9E9;"|
|- style="font-weight:bold"
| colspan="4" |Source:
|
|}

2016

|-
! colspan=2 style="background-color:#E9E9E9;text-align:left;vertical-align:top;" |Candidate
! style="background-color:#E9E9E9;text-align:leftt;vertical-align:top;" |Party
! style="background-color:#E9E9E9;text-align:right;" |Votes
! style="background-color:#E9E9E9;text-align:right;" |%
|-
| style="background-color:"|
|align=left|Larisa Tutova
|align=left|United Russia
|
|68.80%
|-
|style="background-color:"|
|align=left|Grigory Fomenko
|align=left|Communist Party
|
|9.06%
|-
|style="background-color:"|
|align=left|Sergey Ivanov
|align=left|Liberal Democratic Party
|
|8.23%
|-
| style="background-color: " |
|align=left|Anatoly Kotlyarov
|align=left|A Just Russia
|
|4.01%
|-
|style="background-color:"|
|align=left|Pavel Volkov
|align=left|Communists of Russia
|
|3.57%
|-
|style="background-color: " |
|align=left|Aleksandr Musiyenko
|align=left|Yabloko
|
|1.65%
|-
|style="background-color:"|
|align=left|Stanislav Krylov
|align=left|Party of Growth
|
|0.98%
|-
|style="background-color:"|
|align=left|Sergey Novikov
|align=left|The Greens
|
|0.92%
|-
|style="background-color:"|
|align=left|Vyacheslav Voloshchuk
|align=left|Civic Platform
|
|0.76%
|-
| colspan="5" style="background-color:#E9E9E9;"|
|- style="font-weight:bold"
| colspan="3" style="text-align:left;" | Total
| 
| 100%
|-
| colspan="5" style="background-color:#E9E9E9;"|
|- style="font-weight:bold"
| colspan="4" |Source:
|
|}

2021

|-
! colspan=2 style="background-color:#E9E9E9;text-align:left;vertical-align:top;" |Candidate
! style="background-color:#E9E9E9;text-align:left;vertical-align:top;" |Party
! style="background-color:#E9E9E9;text-align:right;" |Votes
! style="background-color:#E9E9E9;text-align:right;" |%
|-
| style="background-color:"|
|align=left|Larisa Tutova (incumbent)
|align=left|United Russia
|
|51.09%
|-
|style="background-color:"|
|align=left|Lavr Cherkashin
|align=left|Communist Party
|
|16.55%
|-
|style="background-color:"|
|align=left|Yevgeny Sutormin
|align=left|Communists of Russia
|
|6.39%
|-
|style="background-color:"|
|align=left|Nikita Rykovsky
|align=left|Liberal Democratic Party
|
|5.31%
|-
|style="background-color:"|
|align=left|Vladislav Makhmudov
|align=left|New People
|
|4.62%
|-
|style="background-color:"|
|align=left|Valentin Dzhagatsbanyan
|align=left|A Just Russia — For Truth
|
|4.39%
|-
|style="background-color:"|
|align=left|Anatoly Kotlyarov
|align=left|Rodina
|
|3.45%
|-
|style="background-color: "|
|align=left|Vladimir Tokarev
|align=left|Russian Party of Freedom and Justice
|
|2.72%
|-
|style="background-color: " |
|align=left|Tatyana Sporysheva
|align=left|Yabloko
|
|2.14%
|-
| colspan="5" style="background-color:#E9E9E9;"|
|- style="font-weight:bold"
| colspan="3" style="text-align:left;" | Total
| 
| 100%
|-
| colspan="5" style="background-color:#E9E9E9;"|
|- style="font-weight:bold"
| colspan="4" |Source:
|
|}

Notes

References

Russian legislative constituencies
Politics of Rostov Oblast